Victor Oscar Johnson (August 3, 1920 – May 10, 2005) was a pitcher who played in Major League Baseball from 1944 through 1946 for the Boston Red Sox and Cleveland Indians. He was born in Eau Claire, Wisconsin.

In a three-season career, Johnson posted a 6–8 record with a 5.06 ERA in 42 appearances, including 15 starts, four complete games, one shutout, two saves, and 31 strikeouts in 126⅓ total innings of work. He was traded by Boston to Cleveland on December 12, 1945 with cash for Jim Bagby and made nine appearances for Cleveland before retiring.
 
Johnson died in his hometown of Eau Claire, Wisconsin at age 84.

External links
Baseball Reference

1920 births
2005 deaths
Boston Red Sox players
Cleveland Indians players
Major League Baseball pitchers
Baseball players from Wisconsin
Eau Claire Bears players
Scranton Red Sox players
Louisville Colonels (minor league) players
New Orleans Pelicans (baseball) players
Nashville Vols players
Baltimore Orioles (IL) players
Oklahoma City Indians players
Anniston Rams players
Sportspeople from Eau Claire, Wisconsin
Burials in Wisconsin